The Heller School for Social Policy and Management is one of the four graduate schools of Brandeis University in Waltham, Massachusetts. It is consistently ranked as one of the top ten schools of social policy and one of the top 50 graduate schools of public affairs in America since 2013 by the U.S. News & World Report.

It is an AACSB and APSIA certified school. The school provides seven academic programs conferring both masters and doctoral degrees. It is also a leading research institution and is the home to 10 institutes and centers focused on both global and domestic social policy issues. Founded in 1959 as the university's first professional school, Heller is located on the Brandeis University main campus along with the Brandeis University Graduate School of Arts and Sciences, Brandeis International Business School, and the Rabb School of Continuing Studies.

Prominent current faculty members at the Heller School include Stuart Altman, Peter Conrad, Anita Hill, Robert Kuttner, and Thomas Shapiro. Former U.S. Secretary of Labor Robert Reich previously taught at the Heller School.  World Bank lists the Heller School as one of eight training institutions in the United States approved to host World Bank scholars pursuing graduate degrees. Heller School has strong links with AmeriCorps, Peace Corps, Tufts University and Northeastern University. The school has a cross-registration consortium with Boston College, Boston University, Massachusetts Institute of Technology and Tufts University. The school currently houses Our Generation Speaks,  a fellowship program and startup incubator whose mission is to bring together young Israeli and Palestinian leaders through entrepreneurship.

History 
Founded in 1959 as Florence G. Heller Graduate School for Advanced Studies in Social Welfare, it became Brandeis first professional graduate school.

The building was designed in 1966 by Benjamin Thompson, built into a hillside on a fieldstone base.

The school is named after Florence G. Heller the first female president of the National Jewish Welfare Board. Charles I. Schottland, a former Federal Commissioner on Social Security, was appointed as the first dean of the school. In 1988, Heller faculty members conducted a research study titled, "Support Services in Senior Housing," that led federal policy makers to enact the National Affordable Housing Act of 1990. In 1998, the 14th Dalai Lama visited Heller and accepted an honorary degree from Brandeis. In 2007, Bill Clinton gave an inaugural lecture at Heller's new building.

Academics 
Heller has 4,800 alumni, with 80% living in the United States and 20% living abroad. As of Fall 2020, it has 471 students, with a fifth of them coming from 53 countries. Of the domestic students, 41% are students of color. It has 145 faculty and research staff, including 39 scientists and fellows. In 2019, it had $19 million of sponsored research from corporations, foundations, and agencies including from United States Department of Justice, the National Institutes of Health and the World Bank. Heller School is one of three New England schools, along with Harvard Kennedy School and University of Connecticut, to be listed on U.S. News & World Reports top 50 graduate schools for public affairs, according to the magazine's 2016 rankings. The Heller School ranks in the top 10 schools for social policy in the United States and in the top 20 in health policy and management. Heller is one of only two New England graduate schools of public affairs to be ranked in either specialty area.
 PhD in Social Policy 
 MBA in Social Impact
 MA in Sustainable International development (MA-SID)
 MS in Global Health Policy and Management
 MA in Conflict Resolution and Coexistence 
 MPP in Public Policy 
Joint degree programs:
 Heller MBA with Tufts Doctor of Medicine
 Heller MBA with Tufts Master of Biomedical Sciences

Faculty 
Heller has 68 faculty members. The key members include, PhD program director Dr. Diana Bowser (PhD, Harvard), M.A SID director Dr. Joan Dassin (PhD, Stanford), MBA program director Carole Carlson (MBA, Harvard University, Business School), MPP program director Michael Doonan (PhD, Brandeis),  Conflict Resolution Director Alain Lempereur (PhD, Harvard), Director Executive Education Dr. Jon A. Chilingerian (PhD, MIT) and undergraduate program director Darren Zinner (PhD, Harvard). Its current dean is Dr. David Weil (PhD, Harvard) while its dean from 2008 to 2014, Dr. Lisa M. Lynch (PhD, LSE), now serves as provost and executive vice president of academic affairs of Brandeis University. Dean David Weil previously served as the administrator of the Wage and Hour Division at the United States Department of Labor under President Obama.

Campus 
The Heller School is located on the campus of Brandeis University in Waltham, Massachusetts. The building occupied by the school is the Schneider building which was designed by Lewis.Tsurumaki.Lewis (LTL Architects) in 2007. It spread at 30,000 Sf, the building includes a library, media center lecture, and breakout spaces, lounges and study areas, faculty and administrative offices, and an open multi-story public "forum" space.

Research Centers 
Heller School is home to 11 research institutes.
 Schneider Institutes for Health Policy
 Institute on Healthcare Systems
 Institute for Behavioral Health
 Institute for Global Health and Development
 Institute on Assets and Social Policy
 Institute for Child, Youth and Family Policy
 Center for Youth and Communities
 Lurie Institute for Disability Policy
 Sillerman Center for the Advancement of Philanthropy
 Center for Global Development and Sustainability
Relational Coordination Research Collaborative

References

External links
 Official Web Site

Brandeis University
Educational institutions established in 1959
University subdivisions in Massachusetts
Public policy schools
1959 establishments in Massachusetts